Qatar competed at the 2008 Summer Olympics in Beijing, China. The country sent its largest ever Olympic delegation to Beijing, with 22 athletes competing in seven sports: athletics, swimming, shooting, weightlifting, fencing, archery and taekwondo.

Qatar is one of at least three countries that sent an all-male delegation to the Beijing Games.

Archery

Athletics

Men
Track & road events

Field events

Fencing 

Men

Shooting

Men

Swimming

Men

Taekwondo

References 

Nations at the 2008 Summer Olympics
2008
Olympics